Saba Homayoon (born April 12, 1977) is a Canadian actress.

Personal life
Saba Homayoon was born in Montreal, Quebec, Canada. She has been married to actor Neil Hopkins since 2007. The pair starred in the TV movie Hit Factor in 2008, which she also executive produced. She played Jinny in Charmed, Yasmin in How I Met Your Mother, and Faatin Amal in NCIS.

Television
Miss Match (2003) (TV series) (1 episode) as secretary
Without a Trace (2003) (TV series) (1 episode) as assistant
Charmed (2004) (TV series) (1 episode) as Jinny the Djinn (demon)
The D.A. (2004) (TV series) (1 episode) as Denise Clark
Dr. Vegas (2004) (TV series) (1 episode) as Meera
How I Met Your Mother (2005) (TV series) (1 episode) as Yasmin
NCIS (2006) (1 episode) as Faatin Amal
Two Families (2007) (TV movie) as social worker
The Loop (2007) (TV series) (2 episodes) as Jane'
Hit Factor (2008) (TV movie) as Layla June' 
Chad (2021) as Naz'

External links

References

1977 births
Canadian film actresses
Living people
Actresses from Montreal
Canadian people of Iranian descent
21st-century Canadian actresses
Canadian television actresses